Decatur is a city in, and the county seat of, DeKalb County, Georgia, which is part of the Atlanta metropolitan area. With a population of 24,928 in the 2020 census, the municipality is sometimes assumed to be larger since multiple ZIP Codes in unincorporated DeKalb County bear Decatur as the address. The city is served by three MARTA rail stations (Decatur, East Lake, and Avondale). The Druid Hills neighborhood is to the northwest of Decatur. The unofficial motto of Decatur used by some residents is "Everything is Greater in Decatur."

History

Early history
Prior to European settlement, the Decatur area was largely forested (a remnant of old-growth forest near Decatur is preserved as Fernbank Forest). Decatur was established at the intersection of two Native American trails: the Sandtown, which led east from the Chattahoochee River at Utoy Creek, and the Shallowford, which follows today's Clairmont Road, and eventually crossed near Roswell. A site for the DeKalb County courthouse was designated in 1822 in what would become downtown Decatur; the city of Decatur was incorporated on December 10, 1823. It was named for United States Navy Commodore Stephen Decatur.

American Civil War
During the American Civil War, Decatur became a strategic site in Sherman's Atlanta Campaign. In July 1864, Major-General James McPherson occupied the town to cut off the Confederates' supply line from Augusta. On July 22, during the Battle of Atlanta, Confederate cavalry under Major-General Joseph Wheeler attacked McPherson's supply wagons and the Union troops left to defend the wagons. A historical marker at the old courthouse marks the site of this skirmish.

20th century
In the second half of the twentieth century the metropolitan area of Atlanta expanded into unincorporated DeKalb County, eventually surrounding two sides of the town of Decatur. Concurrently many well-to-do and middle class white Americans fled the area to more distant suburbs. The 1960s and 1970s witnessed dramatic drops in property values. However, more recently the city has regained economic vigor, partially thanks to several long-term downtown development plans that have come to fruition, making Decatur a trendy small mixed-use district with easy transit to downtown Atlanta. Over the past twenty years, it has gained a local and national reputation as a progressive city with a high level of citizen involvement that retains a small-town feel despite its proximity to Atlanta.

Geography

Decatur is located at  (33.771355, -84.297732).

The Eastern Continental Divide bisects the city along the CSX (formerly Georgia Railroad) trackage right of way.

Transportation

Major roads and expressways

Mass transit
Avondale MARTA Station
Decatur MARTA Station
East Lake MARTA Station

Pedestrians and cycling

Stone Mountain Trail

Demographics

2020 census

As of the 2020 United States census, there were 24,928 people, 8,841 households, and 5,597 families residing in the city.

2010 census
As of the 2010 census, there were 19,335 people, 8,599 occupied housing units, and 4,215 families residing in the city. The racial makeup of the city was 73.5% White, 20.2% African American, 0.2% Native American, 2.9% Asian, 0.0% Pacific Islander, 0.6% from other races, and 2.4% from two or more races. Hispanic or Latino of any race were 3.2% of the population.

There were 2,541 (29.5%) households which had children under the age of 18 living with them, 3,336 (38.8%) were a husband-wife family living together, 984 (11.4%) of households had a female householder with no husband present, and 4,063 (47.2%) did not fit into either of the two previously mentioned categories. 3,263 (37.9%) of all households were made up of individuals of those, 1,814 (21.1%) had someone living alone who was 65 years of age or older. The average household size was 2.17 and the average family size was 2.96.

In the city, 25.1% of the population was under the age of 19, 5.2% from 20 to 24, 32.9% from 25 to 44, 25.7% from 45 to 64, and 11.1% was 65 years of age or older. The median age was 38 years. There are roughly 44 males for every 56 females.

The median income for a household in the city was $73,602. Males had a median income of $73,089 versus $58,580 for females. The per capita income for the city was $42,926. About 12.20% of families and 14.9% of the population were below the poverty line, including 24.2% of those under age 18 and 12.5% of those age 65 or over.

Education levels for Decatur are above average for the Atlanta area, with 56% of residents having obtained a bachelor's degree or higher, and 27% having obtained a graduate degree or higher.

Decatur and adjacent areas are popular with the lesbian community thanks in part to the Indigo Girls, Amy Ray and Emily Saliers. The pair met in elementary school and started making music together in high school in Decatur. They both went on to Emory University and laid down roots in the community.

Education

Primary and secondary schools

City Schools of Decatur, which serves only students within the city limits, holds pre-school to grade twelve, and consists of a pre-K early childhood learning center, five lower elementary schools, two upper elementary schools, a middle school, and a high school. Decatur High School is the district's sole high school. The Decatur City district has 224 full-time teachers and over 4,400 students from pre-K through grade 12.

The DeKalb County School District serves unincorporated DeKalb County.

The Roman Catholic Archdiocese of Atlanta operates St. Thomas More School in Decatur; it opened on September 1, 1950. At first it only had elementary grades and its initial enrollment was 150. A dedicated elementary building opened in 1955, and an addition for kindergarten classes with two rooms was placed in 1994. St. Peter Claver Regional School has a Decatur mailing address but is in nearby Candler-McAfee CDP.

Colleges and universities
 Agnes Scott College
 Columbia Theological Seminary
 Georgia State University's Perimeter College
 DeVry University
 Emory University, northwest of Decatur, was located in unincorporated DeKalb County before being annexed by the City of Atlanta in 2017.

Public libraries
The DeKalb County Public Library system operates the Decatur Branch and is also the Dekalb County Library Headquarters.

Government

Decatur has operated under a Commission-Manager form of government since 1920. The Charter of the City of Decatur establishes the City Commission as the governing and legislative authority of the City government. A five-member City Commission is elected for four-year terms on two-year cycles. Two members are elected from the south side of the city, two from the north side and one is elected at-large. At their organizational meeting each January, the Commissioners elect a mayor and mayor-pro-tem from among their own membership for a one-year term. The mayor is not a separate elected office. The current mayor is Patti Garrett. Previous mayors have included Leslie Jasper Steele (1915), Jack Hamilton, Walter Drake, Mike Mears, Ann A. Crichton, Elizabeth Wilson, William Floyd, Jim Baskett and Scott Candler, Sr. (known as Mr. DeKalb).

The Commission appoints a professional City Manager to carry out the policies, directives and day-to-day business of the city. The current city manager is Andrea Arnold. There are also several citizen volunteer boards and commissions appointed by the City Commission, including the Planning Commission, the Zoning Board of Appeals, and the Historic Preservation Commission.

State representation
The Georgia Department of Juvenile Justice has its headquarters in Avondale Estates, near Decatur. The Georgia Bureau of Investigation has its headquarters near Decatur, in an unincorporated area.

Federal representation
The United States Postal Service operates the Decatur Post Office.

Neighborhoods and historic districts

 Adair Park
 South Candler Street-Agnes Scott College Historic District
 Chelsea Heights
 Clairemont - Great Lakes and Clairemont Historic District
 Clairemont Gateway Association
 Decatur Heights
 College Heights
 Downtown Decatur
 EverGreen Forest
 Glennwood Estates
 Lenox Place
 MAK Historic District
 Midway Woods
 Oakhurst
 Parkwood
 Ponce de Leon Heights
 Ponce de Leon Court Historic District
 Ridgeland Park
 Sycamore Street
 Westchester Hills
 Winnona Park Historic District
   Dearborn Heights

Festivals, special events and arts
Decatur has a thriving art and festival scene. The Decatur Arts Alliance hosts the Decatur Arts Festival each May, in addition to installing public art around the city, providing gallery space for local artists, producing YEA!, which is an event for young emerging artists, and supporting arts and arts education throughout the City.

Decatur holds the annual AJC Decatur Book Festival, which claims to be one of the largest independent book festivals in the United States. It has featured thousands of famous authors, book signings, speeches, and attracted upwards of 85,000 people in 2019.

Decatur is home to Eddie's Attic, which is a live music venue hosting shows almost every night.

Decatur is known for its frequent festivals, which include the annual Decatur Arts Festival, Summer In The City, Decatur BBQ, Blues & Bluegrass Festival, the Decatur Book Festival, the Decatur Maker's Faire, The Decatur Craft Beer Festival and the Decatur Wine Festival. Other events throughout the year include parades, Concerts on the Square, wine crawls, art walks, runs, and races.

Public art in Decatur includes Celebration (artist Gary Price), Valentine (artist George Lundeen), Thomas Jefferson (George Lundeen), Commodore Stephen Decatur (artist unknown), Roy A. Blount Plaza, and Living Walls Murals (various artists).

Dining, breweries and distilleries
Decatur is known for its food scene and was named one of the South's "Tastiest Towns" in 2012. In 2016, the New York Times called it "Atlanta's gastronomic equivalent of Berkeley or Brooklyn".

Noteworthy restaurants and establishments include:
 Brick Store Pub, which was named one of the best beer bars in the nation by Beer Advocate
 Revival, from 2016 James Beard finalist Kevin Gillespie
 Kimball House, named 2014 Best New Restaurant by Southern Living
 plus many more restaurants, coffee shops, pubs, ice cream and yogurt parlors and bakeries

Decatur has a growing beer scene with the award-winning Brick Store Pub, Wild Heaven Beer, and Three Taverns Brewery. The Decatur Craft Beer Festival was named one of the top ten beer festivals in the United States. Decatur is also home to Independent Distilling Co.

Points of interest

Decatur's downtown area and residential neighborhoods are filled with historic structures and sites of interest. This list primarily consists of structures on the National Register of Historic Places, but many remain privately owned and may only be viewed from the exterior.
 South Candler Street-Agnes Scott College Historic District, 141 East College Avenue. This district is on the National Register of Historic Places. It includes both the college campus and surrounding historic homes, and is book-ended by the Winnona Park Historic District to the east and the MAK Historic District to the west.
 Clairemont Historic District, north of Decatur Square
 Columbia Theological Seminary, 701 Columbia Drive. This tree-lined, brick and limestone campus lies within Decatur's Winnona Park neighborhood.
 Cora Beck Hampton Schoolhouse and House, 213 Hillyer Place. These structures are on the National Register of Historic Places.
 Decatur Cemetery, 229 Bell Street. This historic cemetery was founded in the early 19th century and is located northeast of Decatur Square.
 Decatur Railway Depot, 301 East Howard Street. Decatur's renovated depot is now a restaurant known as Kimball House.
 Old DeKalb County Courthouse, 101 East Court Square. The historic courthouse sits in Decatur Square, and contains a small history museum.
 Fraser House, Church Street and Bell Street. This modest 19th-century structure stands at the entrance to Decatur Cemetery.
 Glenwood Elementary, the oldest school in the city
 High House, North Candler Street and Sycamore Street. This antebellum structure is believed to be the oldest two-story structure in Decatur.
 Historic House Complex, 716 and 720 West Trinity Place. Three antebellum homes relocated to Adair Park.
 Historic Oakhurst, in southwest Decatur. An early 20th century town annexed by Decatur, Oakhurst still has its own business district surrounded by bungalows.
 MAK Historic District, McDonough, Adams and Kings Highway. Decatur's first local historic district is full of early 20th century American Craftsman-style homes and has been used by Hollywood for films.
 Methodist Chapel, Commerce Avenue and Sycamore Street. A granite chapel on historic Sycamore Street owned by Decatur First United Methodist Church.
 Old Scottish Rite Hospital, 321 West Hill Street (Oakhurst neighborhood). The historic Shriners' hospital has had an adaptive reuse and now houses restaurants and an art gallery.
 Pythagoras Masonic Lodge, 108 East Ponce de Leon Avenue. A 1924 building designed by architect William Sayward.
 Ponce de Leon Court Historic District. A single street of bungalows and palm trees east of Decatur Square (off Ponce de Leon Avenue).
 Historic Sycamore Street, Some of Decatur's largest historic residences line this street.
 Old U.S. Post Office, 141 Trinity Place. This marble-encased former federal building is on the National Register of Historic Places.
 Winnona Park Historic District, in southeast Decatur. This district is on the National Register of Historic Places for its residences and is also the home of Columbia Theological Seminary.
 Woodlands Garden, 932 Scott Boulevard. Seven acres, mostly wooded with a focus on native plants, and open to the public.

Notable people

B.o.B. - rapper, singer, songwriter
James Banks III (born 1998) - basketball player
Harrison Butker - NFL placekicker for the Kansas City Chiefs
Jason Carter - politician
Mark David Chapman - killed John Lennon
Paul Delaney (born 1986) - basketball player in the Israeli National League
Rebecca Latimer Felton - first woman Senator
Ian Garrison - professional cyclist
Ghetto Mafia - hip hop group
Omari Hardwick - actor
Keri Hilson - singer, actress
Kiera Hogan - professional wrestler
Jan Hooks (1957 - 2014) - actor and comedian
Chris Horton (born 1994) - basketball player for Hapoel Tel Aviv of the Israeli Basketball Premier League
Joshilyn Jackson - author
Emily Jacobson (born 1985) - saber fencer
Jacquees - singer, songwriter
DeForest Kelley - actor, screenwriter, poet, and singer
Alec Kann - professional soccer player
McClain - girl group
China Anne McClain - actress, singer
Sierra McClain - actress, singer
S.P. Miskowski - author
Efrain Morales - soccer player for Atlanta United
Amy Ray (born 1964) - singer, songwriter, Indigo Girls
Joey Rosskopf - professional cyclist
Michael Stipe - lead vocalist, R.E.M.
Baby Tate - rapper, singer
Andrew Toles - outfielder for the Los Angeles Dodgers
Rock Ya-Sin - NFL cornerback for the Las Vegas Raiders
Jordan Walker - baseball player
Devonte Wyatt - NFL defensive tackle for the Green Bay Packers
Carson Crochet - Founder of CA'Buddy, actress, Davidson College alum

Sister cities
Decatur has three sister cities, as designated by Sister Cities International, Inc. (SCI):
 Boussé, Burkina Faso
 Ouahigouya, Burkina Faso
 Trujillo, Peru

See also

 List of municipalities in Georgia (U.S. state)
 National Register of Historic Places listings in DeKalb County, Georgia

Notes

References

 
 Clarke, Caroline McKinney. The story of Decatur, 1823–1899. Dekalb Historical Society (1996).
 Gay, Mary. Life in Dixie During the War, Mercer University Press (2001).
 Kaufman, David R. Peachtree Creek: A Natural and Unnatural History of Atlanta's Watershed, University of Georgia Press (2007).
 Mason, Herman, Jr. African-American Life in DeKalb County, GA, 1823–1970 (Images of America). Arcadia Publishing (1998).
 Owens, Sue Ellen. DeKalb County In Vintage Postcards. DeKalb Historical Society/Arcadia Publishing (2001).
 Price, Vivian. Historic DeKalb County: An Illustrated History (Georgia Heritage Series). Historical Publishing Network (2007).
 Willard, Levi. Early History of Decatur.

External links

 Government
 
 General information
 Bus schedules at Metropolitan Atlanta Rapid Transit Authority (MARTA)
 Decatur Library at DeKalb County Public Library
 Decatur, Georgia at City-Data.com
 Decatur, Georgia at New Georgia Encyclopedia
 
 Wheeler's Cav. at Decatur at The Historical Marker Database (HMdb.org)

 
1823 establishments in Georgia (U.S. state)
Cities in the Atlanta metropolitan area
Cities in DeKalb County, Georgia
Cities in Georgia (U.S. state)
County seats in Georgia (U.S. state)

Planned cities in the United States
Populated places established in 1823